Barry Dean Kernfeld (born August 11, 1950) is an American musicologist and jazz saxophonist who has researched and published extensively about the history of jazz and the biographies of its musicians.

Education 
In 1968, Kernfeld enrolled at University of California, Berkeley; then, from April 1970 to September 1972, he focused on being a professional saxophonist. In October 1972, Kernfeld enrolled at the University of California, Davis, where, in 1975, he earned a Bachelor of Arts in musicology. From 1975 to 1981, he studied at Cornell University where he focused on jazz. Cornell awarded him a master's degree in 1978 and a Doctor of Philosophy degree 1981.

Editing and writing career 
Kernfeld was the editor of the first and second editions of The New Grove Dictionary of Jazz, the largest jazz dictionary ever published. The first edition was published in 1988. Volume 1 had 670 pages and Volume 2 had 690.

In 2005, Kernfeld initiated a long-term project, transcribing and editing the contents of the Smithsonian Jazz Oral History Program. A number of lengthy interviews are now available at the institution's website. Also in 2005, Kernfeld became a staff archivist in the Historical Collections and Labor Archives within Special Collections at the Pennsylvania State University library. In 2012, he taught a writing course at Penn State, "American Jazz Masters in their Own Words."

Kernfeld spent a decade researching pop song piracy which culminated him publishing two books, one about fake books (2006) and the other a general survey (2011). (see book listings below)

Selected published works

References

External links 
 

1950 births
Living people
Pennsylvania State University faculty
Hamilton College (New York) faculty
Cornell University faculty
University of California, Berkeley alumni
University of California, Davis alumni
Cornell University alumni
American music educators
Music historians
Jazz writers
American music historians
American male non-fiction writers
American musicologists
Discographers
Historians from New York (state)